is a nationally-designated nationally designated Place of Scenic Beauty in Iida, Nagano Prefecture, Japan. It is located within the Tenryū-Okumikawa Quasi-National Park. In 1927 it was selected as one of the 100 Landscapes of Japan.

The Tenryū Gorge is a popular sightseeing spot, noted for its ease of access, hot spring resorts, rafting trips on the river and its rugged, rocky scenery.

See also
List of Places of Scenic Beauty of Japan (Nagano)

References

External links
 
 Tenryū-kyō Onsen sightseeing guide 
Iida city official site 

Geography of Nagano Prefecture
Places of Scenic Beauty
Canyons and gorges of Japan
Tourist attractions in Nagano Prefecture
Iida, Nagano
IUCN Category III